Vinjani may refer to:

 Vinjani, Bosnia and Herzegovina, a village near Posušje
 Donji Vinjani, a village near Imotski
 Gornji Vinjani, a village near Imotski